Pierre de Boissieu (born 1945) is a French diplomat and former French ambassador to the European Union (EU). He was the Secretary-General of the Council of the European Union from 1 December 2009 until 26 June 2011. In this post he was preceded by Javier Solana and was succeeded by Uwe Corsepius. Prior to being Secretary General he was Deputy Secretary-General from October 1999 to 30 November 2009.

References 

1945 births
Living people
European Union diplomats
Diplomats from Paris
École nationale d'administration alumni
Permanent Representatives of France to the European Union
French officials of the European Union
Commandeurs of the Légion d'honneur